Lebedyn is a city in Sumy Oblast, Ukraine. Lebedyn is located in Sumy Raion. Before July 2020, Lebedyn served as the administrative center of Lebedyn Raion; it was administratively incorporated as a city of oblast significance and did not belong to the raion. Population:  An air base is located nearby. The city also has a railway station.

History 
Lebedyn was built in 1653 as a small wooden fortress (ostrog) of the Tsardom of Russia. Lebedyn reportedly got its name from the nearby Lebedyn Lake.

In 1708 the settlement was a site of executions of Cossacks in Lebedin, in which supporters of Ivan Mazepa were mass executed on the orders of Peter the Great.

Since April 1780 it was the administrative centre of Lebedin uyezd in Kharkov Governorate of the Russian Empire The district had a territorial extent of 2723.1 versts, or around 1,805 miles, with Lebedyn its capitol.

In the 1897 census the town had a population of 14,301 (6,871 men, 7,430 women), while the District as a whole had a total of 178,144 (88,681 men, 89,463 women) inhabitants.

Following the creation of the Lebedyn Raion on the 7 of March 1923, Lebedyn remained the capitol of the new regional administration.

During World War Two from October 11, 1941, to February 21, 1943, and from March 10 to August 19, 1943, Lebedyn was under German occupation.

In 1994 an oil plant was opened in Lebedyn.

On the 27 of February, 2022, a series of clashes broke out in Lebedyn, with Ukrainian elements defending on the outskirts of Lebedyn at the town of Kamiane at 10:45 PM that day.

At around 7:30 AM, March 5, 2022, Russian forces launched an airstrike on infrastructure in Lebedyn. This included multiple private homes of civilians and cars, as well as gas stations. This notwithstanding the battle resulted in a Ukrainian victory no later than April 4 as Russian troops retreated from the Sumy region.

By April 7, Sumy Oblast, including Lebedyn, regained its communications.

Gallery

See also
 Lebedyn, Cherkasy Oblast

References

Cities in Sumy Oblast
Lebedinsky Uyezd
Cities of regional significance in Ukraine
Cities and towns built in the Sloboda Ukraine